The .17 Ackley Bee is a wildcat centerfire rifle cartridge named after its designer, P.O. Ackley, and is a .218 Bee case necked down to .17 caliber with a squarer shoulder and less body taper. Being a rimmed case it was popular with single shot rifles such as the Martini Cadet and Low Wall Winchester. The caliber is well suited to varmint hunting particularly where minimal pelt damage is required.

See also
 4 mm caliber
 .25-20 Winchester
 List of rifle cartridges

References

External links

Pistol and rifle cartridges
Wildcat cartridges